George Godfrey may refer to:

George Godfrey (boxer born 1897) (1897–1947), American boxer
George Godfrey (boxer born 1853) (1853–1901), Canadian boxer
George Godfrey (curler), American curler
George Godfrey (journalist) (1904–1989), Australian journalist and union leader
George Godfrey (politician) (1834–1920), member of the Victorian Legislative Council (1885–1904) for South Yarra
George Godfrey (swimmer) (1888–1965), South African swimmer
George Godfrey (vaudeville) (1886–1974), general manager of the Orpheum Circuit
George Godfrey (Radio DJ) (born 1992)

See also
George Godfrey Massy Wheeler (1873–1915), VC recipient